Libertia is a genus of monocotyledonous plants in the family Iridaceae, first described as a genus in 1824. It is native to South America, Australia, New Guinea, and New Zealand. Eight species are endemic to New Zealand.

Libertia is made up of herbaceous or evergreen perennials growing from short rhizomes, with simple, linear or narrowly lanceolate basal leaves which are often green but may be red, orange, or yellow under direct sunlight. The showy white or blue trimerous flowers are open in spring and are followed by capsules opening by three valves which contain the numerous seeds.

The genus was named after the Belgian botanist Marie-Anne Libert (1782–1865) (also referred to as Anne-Marie Libert).

The species Libertia chilensis has gained the Royal Horticultural Society’s Award of Garden Merit.

 Species
 Libertia chilensis (Molina) Gunckel - central + southern Chile, southern Argentina, Juan Fernández Islands
 Libertia colombiana R.C.Foster - Colombia, Ecuador, Peru, Bolivia
 Libertia cranwelliae Blanchon, B.G.Murray & Braggins - North Island of New Zealand
 Libertia edgariae Blanchon, B.G.Murray & Braggins  - North Island of New Zealand
 Libertia falcata Ravenna - Los Lagos region of Chile
 Libertia flaccidifolia Blanchon & J.S.Weaver  - North Island of New Zealand
 Libertia grandiflora  (R.Br.) Sweet - North + South Islands of  New Zealand
 Libertia insignis Ravenna - Los Lagos region of Chile
 Libertia ixioides  (G.Forst.) Spreng. - North + South Islands of  New Zealand
 Libertia micrantha A.Cunn. - North + South Islands of  New Zealand
 Libertia mooreae Blanchon, B.G.Murray & Braggins - North + South Islands of  New Zealand
 Libertia paniculata  (R.Br.) Spreng. - eastern Australia - Branching Grass Flag
 Libertia peregrinans Cockayne & Allan - North + South + Chatham Islands of  New Zealand
 Libertia pulchella (R.Br.) Spreng. - New South Wales, Victoria, Tasmania, North + South Islands of  New Zealand, New Guinea
 Libertia sessiliflora (Poepp.) Skottsb. - central Chile
 Libertia tricocca Phil. - central + southern Chile
 Libertia umbellata Ravenna - Los Lagos region of Chile

 Selected formerly included
Numerous names have been coined using the name Libertia, referring to species that are now regarded as better suited to other genera (Bromus Cardiocrinum Hosta Orthrosanthus).

Cytology 

Libertia has a high rate of polyploidy, with 9/11 of assessed species confirmed as polyploid and only 3 confirmed as diploid. This is not unprecedented, with polyploidy being a common feature in the tribe Sisyrinchieae. The uniform base number of x=19 is, however, defining within the tribe. This base number is not found elsewhere in the tribe and only Diplarrhena and Solenomelus have uniform base numbers intragenerically.

All New Zealand endemic species of Libertia are diploid,  hexaploid or dodecaploid, while these levels of ploidy have not been found outside New Zealand. Polyploidy is more prevalent in New Zealand species across all botanical taxa and this has been attributed as a relic of glacial refugia during glacial maximums.

References

 
Iridaceae genera